is an eight-volume manga series by Kiyoko Arai about a young girl named Meilin Kanzaki who is endowed with Feng shui powers which allow her to read people's fortunes and give advice on how to receive good luck. She does this on a website under the pseudonym of "Dr. Rin." Rin is in love with her friend Asuka Yuki, who is a star on the school soccer team. However, she constantly bothers him with her Feng shui advice when he doesn't believe in any of that.

Ask Dr. Rin! was serialized in Ciao. A 51 episode anime adaptation was produced by NAS and TV Tokyo, animated by Studio Comet, directed by Shin Misawa and had music composed by Takanori Arisawa. It was broadcast by TV Tokyo from March 5, 2001 to February 25, 2002. In Indonesia, this anime Originally Broadcast by SCTV since year 2003-2004 and Global TV started in 2016.

Plot
Almost as soon as she mastered talking as a young child, Meirin Kanzaki discovered her feng-shui powers and developed them to such a degree that she has developed an online help desk where she guides and counsels people under the pseudonym of »Dr. Rin« with such skill that she inadvertently leeches away significant commerce from her father Shou.  As is usually the case with 7th grade girls, Meirin is not immune to developing infatuation for  boys her age; in Meirin's case, the boy of choice is her childhood friend Asuka who has a difficult time placing occult phenomenon such as feng-shui in perspective.  Unfortunately for Meirin, securing Asuka's acceptance is the least of her worries when she has visited upon her mysterious events and paranormal phenomenon of such complexity and treachery that she will need all the help and luck she can muster to save the day with her feng-shui divination and the hakke crystal bestowed unto her.

Characters

Kanzaki family

As the main character, Meirin Kanzaki is a teenage girl with the power of feng-shui divination whose potency and accuracy have been argued to exceed that of her father Shou who has his own feng-shui divination service.  Unfortunately for Meirin and the other members of Kanzaki-ke, Meirin's »Dr. Rin« online feng-shui divination help desk has caused many an awkward and disconcerting moment at home because the mere mention of Dr. Rin upsets Shou due to the fact that its heavy commerce is much of Shou's clientele base; as such, Meirin has to watch what she says around Shou so that her secondary identity stays a secret.  A bit ditzy by nature, Meirin is nevertheless pure-hearted in her pursuits, the most notable of which is Asuka Yūki. Much of the series depicts Meirin trying to aid Asuka using her abilities only for Asuka to repulse her counsel because of his disbelief in the occult and his reality-tuned cerebral computation protocols not affording him the capability to understand Meirin's fascination with it. Meirin also owns a special hakke crystal which her grandfather reveals was given to her in order to protect her whose circumstantial instigation repulses away danger by summoning the dragon god Shenlong that then lashes out at the assailant.  Eventually, Meirin learns to consciously bootstrap Shen Shin-long to proactively intercede for people due to her previous incarnation as the Priestess of Light (光の巫女).

Shou Kanzaki is Meirin's father who also boasts the capability of feng-shui divination; in contrast to his daughter, Shou avails his powers as more of a means of entertainment and flirtation with his female fans than as a sincere avenue of guidance although he is not hostile to doing private house calls.  As has been demonstrated throughout the series, the mere mention of Dr. Rin is enough to send Shou into a not-at-all-comical conniption driven by his unwillingness to acknowledge that he is somewhat of a quack that almost forced unto his family the necessity of a clandestine nocturnal relocation to save face when he bungles an important commission at one point in the series.  Shou's playboy proclivities figure heavily into his prologue of how he met his wife Emika.

Emika Kanzaki is Meirin's mother spends most of her time at home as a housewife that does a lot of the typical activities associated with women such as cleaning the house and going shopping; although it is rare, the incidents of divergent concourse that she gets into with her husband Shou seem to stem from the buyer's remorse of having foregone her prologue as a wrestler -- a prologue that she demonstrates as a vehicle of her intense displeasure with Shou when he makes an ill-considered comment about her cooking one episode.  Emika does not seem to realize the true nature of the danger instigated by the potency of her daughter's powers.

Koumi is Meirin's older brother. He helps her keep her Dr. Rin homepage up and covers for her around their parents. He has a grudge against his father for naming him "Koumi" using the kanji for "dumplings (Gyōza)". His name is pronounced as Kōmi(こうみ) instead of "Gyōza".

Accompanying animals

Tenshin is Meirin Kanzaki's pet monkey. Very fond of candy, Tenshin has caused a fair share of trouble for Meirin mostly in childish ways like eating her lunch and snacks. In one episode, Tokiwa uses one of his Shikigami to possess Tenshin in order to lure Asuka into one of his traps.

A small, seven-tailed kitsune-shaped skikigami that belongs to Takashi Tokiwa. Nanao's name, in fact, means, "seven-tailed." He has helped Takashi develop his onmyō abilities since he was very young. Because of this, he has a slightly contentious relationship with his owner. He also apparently has a fondness for eggs.

A small stuffed panda with a soul, who is often seen with Banri Shijo. At the start of the series, because of her strong desire to become a human girl, she is manipulated by the Evil Being and took over Banri's body. After the Evil Being released from her, she and Banri became friends once again. She is interested in Asuka.

 A parrot who shows up frequently with Eddy Tsukioka. His name is the name of the dish takoyaki, which is a dish made with octopus that originated in Osaka. He is very fond of money.

Four gods

Ever since she was jolted onto her derriere as a little kid by a wayward soccer ball, Meirin has come to love Asuka Yuki to no end. Asuka and Meirin's collaborative prologue as childhood friends has prompted the development of a very cohesive relationship between Kanzaki-ke and Yuki-ke; in spite of this, Asuka is frustrated by Meirin incessantly offering her supernatural feng-shui counsel, oblivious to his frequently and emphatically stated aversion thereof.  Takashi Tokiwa's aggression forces Asuka to abandon his ambiguity as he rushes to Meirin's rescue, oblivious to the fact that he is at a disadvantage against the supernatural adversaries which often cannot be damaged by physical attacks.  Off the battlefield, Asuka spends his time playing soccer alongside his best friend and fellow teammate Daisuke Shinagawa.  Once Takashi's computations are purified and the apparition subsequently neutralized, Asuka finds himself prosecuting a friendly rivalry on the soccer field with the young onmyouji.  Asuka has a complex prologue as the reincarnation of Seiryuu that explains his reality-grounded mind.

Often referred to as Tokiwa-chi by the rest of the characters,  Takashi Tokiwa is introduced at the start of the series as a bright and athletic "pretty boy" transfer student whose enrollment into Meirin's school could be argued as having the sole purpose of courting Meirin's favor; while he insists that he only loves Meirin, Takashi does not complain about the attention he garners from flirting with all the other girls.  Unfortunately, Meirin's refusal to return these overtures brings into play Takashi's narcissism that drives him to show off his prowess on the soccer field against Asuka for Meirin's affections before using his supernatural powers as an onmyōji to wield his shikigami paper dolls to cause mysterious accidents as a coercive measure to scare Meirin out of her affection for Asuka; his mind now purified now that the Evil Being controlling him has been exorcised and neutralized, Takashi's real personality is found to be neither cruel nor evil. In spite of his ill-timed interjection into their romantic moments, Takashi is not slow in becoming good friends with Meirin and Asuka which is of great utility when his prologue of his former incarnation as Byakko comes into play.

A boy who uses tarot cards. From the start of his first appearance in the series, he is dressed as a girl because Cynthia takes over his body. He shut his mind after losing his mother from an accident at a young age, and never talked since then, till Meirin saved him. He has black belt in karate. He is the reincarnation of Genbu.

 Eddy is a foreigner who moved to Japan, but in spite of that, he speaks with an Osakan dialect. He is a substitute- Coach of the soccer club after their original coach is hospitalized. Eddy is allergic to beautiful woman because of his painful childhood experiences. His actual job is as that of an Astrologist, but it seem that he had to close down his business because too many of his consulters were female. He is also manipulated by the Evil Being too. Eddy need to gather money to build a tomb for his beloved grandfather next to his grandmother's tomb. He is the reincarnation of Suzaku.

Ancillary allies

Yue is Meirin's classmate and one of her two best friends. She is a member of the school track and field team. She makes jokes often about being in love with Meirin. However, she really wants Meirin's dreams of receiving Asuka's love to come true, as evidenced from how upset she becomes when Meirin starts dating Tokiwa. Yue is generally seen as a very savvy girl with a cool head. Meirin likes to come to her for advice. Shinagawa has a crush on her, but will not actively say it to her.

Shūko is Meirin's other classmate/best friend. In comparison to Yue, she tends to be more hyper and is noted for falling for cute guys quickly. She seems to have a little crush on Tokiwa.

The clumsy mistakes that Daisuke Shinagawa makes throughout the series function as an element of comic relief in the series; still, his jovial selflessness and his emphatic but unrequited infatuation for Yue are nothing to laugh at!  Daisuke plays on the school soccer team with Asuka and Takashi where he is invaluable in helping to restore homeostasis between the two boys as the less-capable, doofy best friend.

A friend of Shinagawa's. He is a skilled goalkeeper who has a "talent" for twisting his body into weird shapes.

Anime
The 51-episode anime series, which was directed by Shin Misawa and produced by TV Tokyo and NAS, was broadcast on TV Tokyo from March 5, 2001 to February 25, 2002. Animation was provided by Studio Comet, character designs are provided by Takahisa Ichikawa, and the music was composed by Takanori Arisawa. The opening theme is "Go! Go! Ready? Go?!", the first ending theme is "Dare Yori" and the second ending theme is "Kimi to no Mirai", all by Ai Maeda.

References

External links 
 

2001 anime television series debuts
2000 manga
TV Tokyo original programming
Japanese children's animated comedy television series
Anime series based on manga
Magical girl anime and manga
Manga adapted into television series
Romance anime and manga
Shōjo manga